Arthur Bunte (born November 16, 1933) is an American retired basketball player, best known for his All-American college career at the University of Utah.

Bunte played high school basketball at South High School in Denver, Colorado, then committed to the University of Colorado. He played two years at Colorado, but elected to transfer after his sophomore season, despite averaging 19.1 points per game and earning first-team All-Big Seven Conference honors in 1953. He then landed at Utah to play for new coach Jack Gardner. Bunte proved to be a prolific scorer for the Utes, despite being an undersized but solidly-built post player. He used deceptive quickness and a deft shooting touch to score against larger opponents. Bunte was named an All-American in 1955 after leading the Utes to the Skyline Conference title and a berth in the 1955 NCAA Tournament. He repeated the feat the following season.

Following the end of his college career, Bunte was drafted by the New York Knicks in the 1956 NBA draft. He played several years in the Amateur Athletic Union for the Denver-Chicago Truckers and the Phillips 66ers. Following his retirement from basketball, Bunte went into the trucking business until his retirement in 2000.

References

1933 births
Living people
All-American college men's basketball players
Amateur Athletic Union men's basketball players
American men's basketball players
Basketball players from Denver
Centers (basketball)
Colorado Buffaloes men's basketball players
Forwards (basketball)
New York Knicks draft picks
Phillips 66ers players
Utah Utes men's basketball players